Fal Rural District is a rural district (dehestan) in Galleh Dar District, Mohr County, Fars Province, Iran. At the 2006 census, its population was 5,869, in 1,120 families.  The rural district has 6 villages.

References 

Rural Districts of Fars Province
Mohr County